Shchibrovo is a rural locality (a village) in Ivanovskoye Rural Settlement, Kovrovsky District, Vladimir Oblast, Russia. The population was 1 as of 2010.

Geography 
Shchibrovo is located 41 km southeast of Kovrov (the district's administrative centre) by road. Novoye is the nearest rural locality.

References 

Rural localities in Kovrovsky District